Jaliscoa is a genus of Mexican flowering plants in the family Asteraceae.

The genus is named for the State of Jalisco in western Mexico.

 Species
 Jaliscoa goldmanii (B.L.Rob.) R.M.King & H.Rob. - Jalisco, Durango, Chihuahua
 Jaliscoa paleacea (Cronquist) R.M.King & H.Rob.  - Jalisco
 Jaliscoa pringlei S.Watson - Jalisco, Morelos, Guerrero, Michoacán

References

Asteraceae genera
Endemic flora of Mexico
Eupatorieae